Read Out! was a Canadian English language talk show. Read Out! premiered on April 18, 2003 at 7:30 pm EST on Canadian digital cable specialty channel, PrideVision, now known as OUTtv.

Premise
Read Out! is a talk show where host Mathieu Chantelois interviews LGBT authors and discusses their work and their lives.

References

OutTV (Canadian TV channel) original programming
2003 Canadian television series debuts
2000s Canadian television talk shows
2000s Canadian LGBT-related television series